Sirik (also Romanized as Sīrīk; also Sirik-e Kohneh, also Romanized as Sīrīk-e Kohneh) is a city and the capital of Central, in Sirik County, Hormozgan Province, Iran. It overlooks the Strait of Hormuz and contains a small harbour to the northwest of the main settlement. At the 2006 census, its population was 3,640, in 640 families. The Minab River empties into the sea near Sirik, and a mangrove estuary is located here. To the northwest 
along the coast to Bandar-e-Abbas, there are thousands of hidden caves and valleys dotted around the horn of the Strait of Hormuz.

See also

List of lighthouses in Iran

References 

Populated places in Sirik County
Cities in Hormozgan Province
Lighthouses in Iran